Olympic Gardens Football Club is a Jamaican football club based in Kingston. The men's team won the KSAFA Major League in the 2018–19 season.

The club also runs a youth department, and a women's team.

References

Football clubs in Jamaica
Sport in Kingston, Jamaica